Soňa Červená (born 9 September 1925) is a Czech operatic mezzo-soprano who's had an active international career since the 1950s. She has enjoyed particularly lengthy and fruitful associations with the Frankfurt Opera and the San Francisco Opera. She is currently on the roster of singers at the National Theatre in Prague.

Biography
Born in Prague on 9 September 1925, Červená is the daughter of the famous Czech writer  and the great granddaughter of the brass instrument maker Václav Červený. Her father and mother, Žofie Veselíková, were both imprisoned by Nazis during WWII.  Her mother died in a Communist jail in 1948, the year of a Communist coup-d'etat in Czechoslovakia.  Červená learned about her mother's death and with the help of a pathologist stole her mother's body to secretly bury her in her family grave in Prague. 

She studied voice with Robert Rozner and Lydia Wegner-Salmowá in her home city before beginning her career performing with an operetta ensemble in Prague. She made her professional opera début in 1954 at the opera house in Brno where she remained for the next three years.

Červená had a major success at the National Theatre in Prague as Octavian in Richard Strauss's Der Rosenkavalier in 1957. She portrayed that role again for her debut at the Berlin State Opera the following year; becoming committed to that house from 1958 to 1961. After this she became a principal artist at the Opern- und Schauspielhaus Frankfurt, which remained her principal home until the early 1990s. She sang in a wide variety of performances, including the première of Rudolf Wagner-Régeny's Das Bergwerk zu Falun at the Salzburg Festival in 1961. She also made several guest appearances at the Deutsche Oper Berlin, Hamburg State Opera, Semperoper, and the Vienna State Opera.

In 1962, Červená made her United States debut at the San Francisco Opera in the title role of Georges Bizet's Carmen. She returned almost annually to this house through 1971 in such roles as Anna in Les Troyens, Azucena in Il trovatore, Berta in The Barber of Seville, Clairon in Strauss's Capriccio, Countess de Coigny in Andrea Chénier, Countess Geschwitz in Lulu, the First Norn in Götterdämmerung, Fricka in Das Rheingold, Herodias in Salome, The innkeeper in Boris Godunov, Marcellina in The Marriage of Figaro, The Marquise of Birkenfeld in La fille du régiment, Marthe Schwertlein in Faust, Mistress Quickly in Falstaff, the Mother in Louise, Mother Goose in The Rake's Progress, Prince Orlofsky, Rossweisse in Die Walküre, Tisbe in La Cenerentola, and the Woman in the United States premiere of Gunther Schuller's The Visitation. After a nine-year absence, Červená returned to San Francisco in 1980 to portray Countess Waldner in Arabella, Flora in La traviata, Mamma Lucia in Cavalleria Rusticana, and Starenka Buryjovka in Jenůfa.

Červená has made several appearances at the Bayreuth Festival, including Floßhilde in The Ring Cycle (1960), Rossweisse (1966–67), and a Flower Maiden in Parsifal (1962–63 and 1966–67). She portrayed Clairon at the 1963 and 1964 Glyndebourne Festivals. With the London Symphony Orchestra she appeared as a soloist in a performance of Ludwig van Beethoven's Missa Solemnis. In 1971 she made her debut at the Lyric Opera of Chicago as Herodias. In 1981 she sang in the world premiere of Antonio Bibalo's Ghosts at the Kiel Opera House. In 1983 she gave an acclaimed portrayal of Marfa Ignatevna Kabanová in Leoš Janáček's Káťa Kabanová at La Monnaie.

In 2004, Červená was honored with a Thalia Award.
 
She has been starring as Emilia Marty in the Janáček opera The Makropulos Case (based on the Karel Čapek play), directed by Robert Wilson, at the National Theatre in Prague since the production's debut in November 2010.

See also 
 26897 Červená, asteroid

References

1925 births
Living people
21st-century Czech women opera singers
Operatic mezzo-sopranos
Recipients of Medal of Merit (Czech Republic)
Musicians from Prague
Czechoslovak women opera singers
20th-century Czech women opera singers
Recipients of the Thalia Award